Emilia's gracile opossum (Gracilinanus emiliae) is an opossum species from South America. It is found in Brazil, Colombia, French Guiana, Suriname.

References

Opossums
Marsupials of South America
Mammals of Brazil
Mammals of Colombia
Mammals of Guyana
Mammals of Suriname
Mammals described in 1909
Taxa named by Oldfield Thomas